The 2015 Omaha Beef season was the team's sixteenth season as a professional indoor football franchise and first as a member of Champions Indoor Football (CIF). One of nine teams in the CIF for the inaugural 2015 season, the Omaha Beef was owned and operated by Rich Tokheim and Jim Tokheim. The Beef played their home games at the Ralston Arena in Ralston, Nebraska, under the direction of head coach Cory Ross.

Season summary
After a pre-season win over the Metro Militia of the Central Plains Football League, the Beef struggled to find their footing in the CIF. Omaha dropped 5 straight games before a close win at home over the Sioux City Bandits. That would prove the Beef's only win this season as they lost the remaining 6 games on the schedule. Finishing ninth in a nine-team league, Omaha did not qualify for post-season play.

Off-field moves
After the 2014 season ended, the CPIFL announced it was merging with teams from other leagues to form Champions Indoor Football.

In early January 2015, the Beef named former Nebraska Cornhusker and NFL veteran Cory Ross as the team's new head coach. At the same time, they announced Josh Bullocks, Keyuo Craver, and Demetrius Ross as assistant coaches for the 2015 season.  Neither Bullocks or Craver would actually coach the Omaha Beef in 2015.

The Beef's announced schedule for the 2015 season was not directly affected when the New Mexico Stars abruptly postponed their entry into the league on February 21, just one week before the season began. On March 3, the Albuquerque-based Duke City Gladiators were announced as a late entry into the league, partially replacing the Stars in the CIF schedule with a plan to play 11 games in 2015.

Awards and honors
Each week of the regular season, the CIF names league-wide Players of the Week in offensive, defensive, and special teams categories. For Week 2, the CIF named running back Jesse Robertson as the Defensive Player of the Week. For Week 7, the CIF named quarterback Chuck Wright as the Offensive Player of the Week.  The Omaha Beef failed to place any players on the Champions Indoor Football 2015 1st Team or 2nd Team All-League Honors.

Schedule
Key:

Pre-season

Regular season

Roster

Standings

Playoffs

References

External links
Omaha Beef official website
Omaha Beef at Our Sports Central

Omaha Beef
Omaha Beef
Omaha Beef seasons